Sizewell C nuclear power station is a project to construct a 3,200MWe nuclear power station with two EPR reactors in Suffolk, England. The project was proposed by a consortium of EDF Energy and China General Nuclear Power Group, which own 80% and 20% of the project respectively. In 2022, UK Government announced a buy-out to allow for the exit of CGN from the project and forming a 50% stake with EDF, though EDF expect this to fall below 20% following anticipated external investment. The power station is expected to meet up to 7% of the UK's demand if it comes into service.

The project is expected to commence before 2024, with construction taking between nine and twelve years, depending on developments at the Hinkley Point C nuclear power station, which is also being developed by EDF Energy and which shares major similarities with the Sizewell plant.

History
In 2008, the government decided that new nuclear sites should be constructed on existing sites to replace the UK's ageing fleet of reactors. In 2010 the government revealed that the Sizewell power station site was one of the eight locations at which it intended to allow the development to occur. Following this, EDF Energy put forward proposals for the Sizewell site in November 2012, where it planned to construct two EPR reactors.

In 2015, as a part of the government's strategy to open the UK up to China, it was reported that after talks with China agreements had been made to develop three nuclear power plants including Sizewell C, Hinkley Point C and Bradwell B; however, agreements had not yet been made over financing the Sizewell project, with the final agreement likely to be made after the construction of Hinkley Point C had started.

On 21 October 2015, EDF Energy announced that it had 'agreed the Heads of Terms of a wider UK partnership for the joint development of new nuclear power stations at Sizewell in Suffolk and Bradwell in Essex' with China General Nuclear Power Group (CGN). At the same time, EDF Energy also announced that it 'will take an 80% share and CGN will take a 20% share' during the development phase of the project.

Following extensive consultation with the local community, on 27 May 2020 EDF Energy announced that it had submitted a development consent order application. EDF stated that 25,000 job opportunities would be created and targeted 70% of the investment to be spent in UK. The plant would largely replicate the Hinkley Point C design to reuse experience and attempt to lower costs.

In June 2020, EDF had yet to organise financing, and could not take on more construction risk in the UK. EDF was looking to the UK government to assist with financing either by offering a Regulated Asset Base (RAB) model used on less risky infrastructure, though that puts an immediate cost burden on end consumers, or with other approaches such as a government equity stake in the development.

On 30 June 2020, EDF Energy announced that it had applied to the Office for Nuclear Regulation (ONR) for a licence to build and operate Sizewell C. The ONR is responsible for the safe operation of nuclear sites in the UK and for permitting new nuclear site licencesone of the key regulatory requirements for building and operating a new power station.

On 11 September 2020, Suffolk county council said that it could not support the plans for the construction of Sizewell C in its current form, with the council saying on 23 October 2020 that the plans "do not go far enough" to mitigate the impact on the local community and on the local environment. The council said that a lack of support for the project was not the issue, and that it is that EDF "simply does not appropriately and sensitively address the impacts on our communities and the environment". EDF responded by submitting significant changes to the project which aimed to significantly reduce the number of Heavy Goods Vehicles delivering the materials required for the project by having them delivered by train and sea instead. The plans also proposed to increase the amount of land for the creation of fen meadow to help increase the net gain of biodiversity following the completion of the project. A consultation period began on 16 November 2020, which lasted for 30 days and which will inform all of the stakeholders in the project about the proposals.

On 31 October 2020, the BBC claimed that the government was 'close' to giving the project the green light following intensified talks with EDF, with government officials insisting that it "remains committed to new nuclear" following the withdrawal of Horizon from Wylfa and Oldbury. The BBC also reported that the government had increased its interest in taking a stake in the project following work on the second reactor at Hinkley Point C being completed 30% faster than the first reactor, which 'is thought to have substantially mitigated' the risk in taking a stake in the project.

On 14 December 2020, the UK government published an energy white paper setting out its plans to "transition to net zero", and announced the start of negotiations with EDF, with a view to starting investment on "at least one" new power station before the end of the current parliament in 2024. CGN is thought to be planning to withdraw from the project.

On 20 July 2022, the planning application was approved and a Development Consent Order was issued by the Secretary of State. 

On 3 November 2022, the plant was placed under review in the government's effort to cut spending. Chancellor of the Exchequer Jeremy Hunt confirmed on 17 November 2022 that construction would go ahead, with initial contracts to be signed "within weeks".

Timeline

Construction
The Sizewell C project is expected to take between nine and twelve years to construct and commission. EDF expects significant time and cost savings compared to the near-identical sister plant, Hinkley Point C. The projected construction cost of £20billion for Sizewell C when the application for a nuclear site licence was submitted in 2020 is 25% higher than the £16billion that were projected for Hinkley Point C at a similar stage of the planning process in 2012, raising doubts about EDF's claim.

Financing
The Sizewell C project is expected to cost £20billion to £30billion. The project is being led by EDF Energy and CGN, which own 80% and 20% of the project, respectively.

EDF is looking to the UK government to assist with financing either by offering a Regulated Asset Base model, though that puts an immediate cost burden on end consumers, or with other approaches such as a government equity stake in the development, as the company is unwilling to take on further risk within the UK. On 30 June 2020, EDF announced that it had applied to the Office for Nuclear Regulation for a licence to build and operate Sizewell C.

On 14 July 2020, 32 companies and organisations from the UK nuclear supply chain formed a consortium to encourage the government to support the state-guaranteed financing model for Sizewell C, Regulated Asset Base, which the consortium says would reduce the cost of new nuclear projects by having consumers pay the cost upfront through their energy bills.

On 30 September 2020, Jean-Bernard Lévy, EDF's chairman and CEO, demanded that the Treasury provided clarity on the future of nuclear funding following Hitachi's withdrawal from the Wylfa Newydd nuclear power station project which was set to cost £20billion, citing a lack of viable funding.

On 14 December 2020, following the release of the UK government's long-awaited energy white paper, the government announced that it had started consultations with EDF to take a stake in the project following concerns that CGN is backing out of the project, which would leave a financing gap. The government also warned that any stake in the project would be 'subject to approval on areas such as value for money and affordability' with the Secretary of State for Business, Energy and Industrial Strategy, Alok Sharma, saying, "We are starting negotiations with EDF, it is not a green light on the construction".

In January 2022, the UK government invested £100million towards continued development of the project. In March 2022, it was announced that the UK government and EDF would each take a 20% stake in the project, with infrastructure investors and pension funds expected to take up the remaining 60%.

In August 2022, The Guardian reported expected costs were £20billion to be paid with £1.7billion of taxpayer money and a surcharge on customer energy bills through the Regulated Asset Base model. Barclays had been hired to find new financial backing.

In November 2022, the UK government announced that it was taking over a 50% stake in the project for £679million.
In February 2023, EDF confirmed that following anticipated external investment its shareholding in the project will be no more than 19.9%. Project costs estimates vary from £20 billion to £35 billion.

Criticism and opposition

Opposition groups

Groups that opposed the construction of the plant include Together Against Sizewell C (TASC) and Stop Sizewell C.

TASC sought a judicial review of the East Suffolk Council's decision to grant planning permission in September 2019 for preparatory works on the site, which would involve the felling of 229 trees as well as the demolition of buildings on the Sizewell B site. The group claimed that the decision was unlawful and that proper investigations into the potential scale of environmental damage had not occurred. The bid to block the works were brought forwards by a local resident, Joan Girling, on behalf of TASC to the High Court. The court heard the case on 8 September 2020, and ruled that the habitat loss would be "minor" and "not significant". Mr Justice Holgate rejected the attempt to block the works, and said that he "did not accept East Suffolk Council acted irrationally". An EDF spokesperson responded to the rulings by saying that "The judge acknowledged the robust nature of the report provided by East Suffolk Council regarding the environmental impact of the work. The report, which was informed by the council arboriculturist, found that the majority (73%) of the 229 trees that need to be removed from Coronation Wood are low quality plantation wood with a limited life expectancy and limited amenity value. It was judged that this loss would be 'balanced' by the planting of over 2,500 juvenile woodland trees, including a mixture of broadleaf and coniferous species appropriate for the prevailing soil and coastal conditions."

On 6 October 2020, TASC and the Stop Sizewell C group delivered a petition with over 10,400 signatures to Downing Street, the Treasury and the Department of Business, Energy and Industrial Strategy, calling for the government to stop Sizewell C as the plans would be costly, risky and would not positively contribute to net zero until 2040.

Stop Sizewell C is the campaign name of Theberton and Eastbridge Action Group (TEAGS). TEAGS was formed in 2013 by representatives of the Suffolk parish of Theberton and Eastbridge, which neighbours the proposed Sizewell C construction site, in order to give a voice to the community. TEAGS did not initially oppose Sizewell C, but after eight years of engagement with EDF and other stakeholders, the group changed its name to Stop Sizewell C.

Concerns regarding Chinese involvement
Concerns have been expressed regarding one of the shareholders in the consortium, CGN, which is owned by the Chinese government and has been blacklisted by the United States Department of Commerce for attempting to acquire advanced U.S. nuclear technology and material for diversion to military use.
In September 2020, following Hitachi's decision to withdraw from the Wylfa and Oldbury projects, the BBC reported that the UK government was looking to replace CGN as an investor and might take a stake in Sizewell C.

Concerns regarding water consumption
Some environmental campaigners and Sizewell critics have questioned if it will be possible to meet the plant's need for potable water without adversely impacting the supplies available to surrounding areas. Critics estimated that Sizewell C would require a further  of potable water daily, and suggested that EDF were planning to use the mains supply because it would be cheaper than the alternative of establishing a desalination plant. Essex and Suffolk Water, the mains-water supplier for the area, stated in response that they were satisfied that the water supply would be "sustainable" for the next 25 years even if Sizewell C were to be built.

However, Essex and Suffolk Water later reversed its position, leading EDF to plan instead on using a temporary desalination plant to provide for construction water needs while also building a permanent  pipeline from the River Waveney to the Sizewell C sitebut this plan was also halted when in August 2021 Essex and Suffolk Water informed EDF that the Environment Agency would be curtailing their licences to abstract water from the River Waveney by up to 60%. The water company subsequently confirmed that "existing water resources (including the River Waveney) will not be sufficient to meet forecast mains water demand, including the operational demand of Sizewell C," leading EDF to declare that it would rely on a permanent desalination system supplying the plant's needs if no other solution could be found. This was accepted by the Secretary of State for Business, Energy and Industrial Strategy, Kwasi Kwarteng, who held that "the uncertainty over the permanent water supply strategy is not a barrier to granting consent" to the Sizewell C project.

On 8 August 2022, Together Against Sizewell C (TASC), supported by Friends of the Earth, announced its intention to contest the development consent order, based primarily on the failure to first secure a water supply. In its earlier rejection of the scheme, the Planning Inspectorate had stated that "unless the outstanding water supply strategy can be resolved and sufficient information provided to enable the secretary of state to carry out his obligations under the Habitats Regulations, the case for an order granting development consent for the application is not made out".

Preference for other energy sources

Researchers such as Professor Barrett et al at UCL claim, based on detailed cost studies, that a judicious mix of renewable energy, storage, and renewable firm power offers the same constant availability of power as Sizewell C, at lower cost.

See also

 Nuclear power in the United Kingdom
 Energy policy of the United Kingdom
 Energy in the United Kingdom
 List of nuclear reactors#United Kingdom
 Proposed nuclear power stations in the United Kingdom
 Hinkley Point C nuclear power station

References

External links
 Sizewell C planning documentation on National Infrastructure Planning website.

Buildings and structures in Suffolk
Proposed nuclear power stations in the United Kingdom
Nuclear power stations using EPR reactors
Proposed power stations in England
Électricité de France
Nationally Significant Infrastructure Projects (United Kingdom)